Al Furjan is an upscale neighbourhood, gated community, and property development in the Jebel Ali district, Dubai, United Arab Emirates. Nakheel Properties heads the development and Azizi Developments owns the largest number of residential buildings. It borders Jebel Ali Village and is near Ibn Battuta Mall, the Gardens, and the site of the Expo 2020, which is one of its major draws. Sheikh Zayed Road and Sheikh Mohammad Bin Zayed Road are also very accessible from the community. Homes in Al Furjan are typically built in Al Hejaz (inspired by traditional Arabic architecture), Dubai (local architectural style), or Quortaj (Islamic/Mediterranean architecture) styles.

In addition to constructions from Nakheel and Azizi, Al Furjan also features buildings by Danube Properties, Ghreiwati Properties, Al Jaziri Brothers, Seen Real Estate Developers, Jag Development, Meilenstein Real Estate Development, CPL Real Estate Development, Invest Group Overseas, MAG Property Development, Diamond Real Estate Developers, and Wasl Properties.

History
The first phase of the project, which would focus on the East and South villages, was announced in September 2007 and its 800 villas and terrace homes sold out within a week. Phase two would focus on the North and West villages. In June 2008, Nakheel Properties awarded Arabtec Holding PJSC with a AED $3 billion contract, the first of the project, to build 1,400 homes. Al Shafar Transport and Contracting Company won the second contract and were tasked with building villas and terraced homes. As of July 2021, the development is still in phase one. The project was originally scheduled for completion in 2011 and was to make up 4,000 residences, a number of hotels, restaurants, and shops, and would house 90,000 people. Construction was halted in 2009 due to a major housing crash in Dubai but restarted all short-term projects by the end of the year, with Al Shafar the first contractor to resume work. Arabtec construction halted again in January 2010 due to unpaid arrears. 

Mohammed Rashed has been the Director of the project since its inception.

Nakheel
Construction on Nakheel's main Al Furjan community began in 2009 was originally anticipated to be completed in 2011 and was projected to cost US$1.5 billion.

Al Furjan by Nakheel a villa sub-community within Al Furjan and was the first to be built. Masakin Al Furjan is a seven-block, low-rise, family-oriented community located in the South Village. Marooj Al Furjan is a residential community with 418 villas. Construction began in 2021 and is slated for completion in 2024. 418 homes were put up for sale as off-plan properties and were completely sold out within four hours.

The Al Furjan Pavilion in Al Furjan South, built by Nakeel and opened in December 2016, contains a Spinneys, a Medicentre clinic (GPs, pediatricians, dentists), a 300-car lot, a membership recreation center, and several storefronts for restaurants and retail.

Azizi

Though Nakheel is the main developer of the community, Azizi Developments has a very large presence; as of February 2021, they have built 18 residential buildings in Al Furjan. Its Yasamine, Feriouz, Orchid, Acacia, Tulip, Aster, Liatris, Freesia, Daisy, and Iris buildings all opened in 2017. The Roy-Mediterranean and the Montrell, both serviced apartments, were announced in 2016 and opened in 2018 and contain high-end apartments. The Samia, which contains a mosque and nursery among its amenities, and the Ferista also opened in 2018. The Pearl and the Plaza both opened in 2019 and the Farishta in 2020. The Shaista opened in early 2021 and the Star, which has nearly 500 apartments and 13 retail spaces, opened in the summer of 2021. The Berton began construction in 2017 and was originally scheduled to open in 2019, but is now expected to be finished by the end of 2021.

Education
At its launch in 2007, two schools were planned for Al Furjan. The Arbor School opened in 2018 as a preschool through year six institution and has been adding year groups on each year since its inception. The Arbor School teaches from the National Curriculum for England. It is considered the first eco-school in the UAE. Al Furjan South has a branch of Jebel Ali Village Nursery, which caters to children ages 18 months to 4 years. Arcadia Education announced it would open its third location in Al Furjan in August 2021 and would offer up to year eleven.

Religious buildings
Al Furjan West has a mosque located next to the Al Furjan West Pavilion. Al Furjan South also has a mosque. The community does not currently have any synagogues, temples, or churches and non-Muslim residents are encouraged to attend religious services at facilities in nearby Jabel Ali.

Transport
The location is served by the eponymous Al Furjan metro station, part of the Dubai Metro on the Route 2020 extension to the Red Line for Expo 2020.

References

External links
Ameinfo.com
Overseaspropertymall.co
Constructionweekonline.com

2008 establishments in the United Arab Emirates
Communities in Dubai
Nakheel Properties
Planned developments
Planned residential developments
Gated communities in the United Arab Emirates